Golden Eye is the fourth studio album of Christina Aguilar - a popular Thai artist. After 3 years of her biggest-hit album "Red Beat", "Golden Eye" was released in September. She grew up and had an appearance like a sexy working women. However, the theme of the album continued on Pop/Dance music.

First single, "Ya Mong Trong Nun (Don't Look at That)", was one of her greatest hits. The music video was wonderful. Although her love ballad single, "Fak Kwam Yin Dee (Pleasing Your Girl)", was not very famous. It was maybe because the song talk about the hopeless broken heart, contrast with her previous big hit love ballad single "Rak Thur Thee Sud (Love You The Most)".

The 3rd single was "Pood Eek Thee (Say It Again)". The song had colorful and joined lyric. It talk about the girl want her boyfriend to say "Love" again. The music video also help the single to be hit. Christina dressed in colorful 60th style. This single was her most popular track in the dance club.

The 4th single was another love ballad song, "Mai Tong Khob Jai (Don't Say Thank You)".In this album, Christina also wrote the 5th single that was "Tai Pa Hom Oun (Underneath a Worm Blanket)". And there was one song that had Thai-French lyric which French lyric had written by her. The song was "Bai Mai (Leaf)". The album was not so big hit like "Red Beat" but it also reached 1,000,000 copies. It was the 4th solo album of her that have sold over 1,700,000 copies.

Track listing
 Ya Mong Trong Nun (Don't Look at That)
 Fak Kwam Yin Dee (Pleasing Your Girl
 Jab Mat Wai (Bind Him)
 Tai Pa Hom Oun (Underneath a Worm Blanket)
 Pood Eek Thee (Say It Again)
 Mai Tong Khob Jai (Don't Say Thank You)
 Rak Kan Yang Diaw Mai Po (Love Isn't Enough)
 Thur Ou Nai (Where Are You)
 Ou To Thurh Na (Please Stay)
 Bai Mai (Leaf)

Christina Aguilar albums
Thai-language albums
1997 albums